Tom Scott (January 6, 1908 – November 24, 1993) was a head coach of the University of North Carolina Tar Heels men's basketball team from 1946–1952. While at UNC, Scott amassed a record of 100–65. His last two teams at UNC had losing records and he was consequently replaced by Frank McGuire as head coach.

A graduate of Kansas State Teachers College of Pittsburg (now Pittsburg State University) in 1930, Scott also coached at Concordia-Moorhead, 
 Central Missouri State, and Davidson College and also serving as Davidson's Athletic Director from 1955 to 1974. As AD
at Davidson he hired both Lefty Driesell and Terry Holland as head basketball coaches. He also coached the Davidson golf team to five Southern Conference championships. He was a chairman of the National Collegiate Athletic Association's basketball committee. Scott was inducted into the Davidson Athletics Hall of Fame in 1990 and the Central Missouri State Hall of Fame in 1993.

Head coaching record

References

External links
 Tom Scott's obituary

1908 births
1993 deaths
Basketball coaches from Kansas
Basketball players from Kansas
Central Missouri Mules basketball coaches
Concordia Cobbers men's basketball coaches
Davidson Wildcats athletic directors
Davidson Wildcats men's basketball coaches
North Carolina Tar Heels men's basketball coaches
People from Crawford County, Kansas
Pittsburg State Gorillas men's basketball players